Events in 2006 in animation.

Events

February
 February 4: The 33rd Annie Awards are held.
February 24: My Gym Partner's a Monkey premieres after airing its sneak peek on December 26, 2005.

March
 March 15: Christian Volckman's Renaissance premiers.
 March 22: The South Park episode "The Return of Chef" premieres, in which the character Chef dies.
 March 26: The Simpsons episode "Homer Simpson, This Is Your Wife" premieres, guest starring Ricky Gervais.

April
 April 9: The Simpsons episode "Kiss Kiss, Bang Bangalore" premieres, in which the family travels to India.
 April 11: Winnie the Pooh receives a star at the Hollywood Walk of Fame.
 April 20: Paul Laurence Robertson's Pirate Baby's Cabana Battle Street Fight 2006 is released online.

May
 May 19: Tim Johnson and Karey Kirkpatrick's Over the Hedge premiers.
 May 25: Richard Linklater's A Scanner Darkly premiers.

June
 June 3: Alan Becker releases "Animator vs Animation" on Newgrounds.
 June 9: Disney/Pixar's Cars premieres.
 June 17: Peter Lord and David Sproxton, founders of Aardman Animations, receive a CBE.

September
 September 4: The first episode of Curious George airs and PBS Kids Preschool Block launches.
 September 9: Qubo launches as NBC's new block.
 September 10: The Simpsons episode "The Mook, the Chef, the Wife and Her Homer" premieres, guest starring heavy metal band Metallica.
 September 17: The Simpsons episode "Jazzy and the Pussycats" premieres, guest starring the White Stripes.
 September 29: The first feature film produced by Sony Pictures Animation, Open Season, premiers.

November
 November 14: 11th Animation Kobe is held.

December
 December 27: Early Abstractions is added to the National Film Registry.

Awards
Academy Award for Best Animated Feature: Happy Feet
Animation Kobe Feature Film Award: The Girl Who Leapt Through Time
Annie Award for Best Animated Feature: Cars
BAFTA Award for Best Animated Film: Happy Feet
Goya Award for Best Animated Film: El Ratón Pérez
Japan Academy Prize for Animation of the Year: The Girl Who Leapt Through Time
Japan Media Arts Festival Animation Award: The Girl Who Leapt Through Time
Mainichi Film Awards - Animation Grand Award: The Girl Who Leapt Through Time

Films released

 January 7 - Origin: Spirits of the Past (Japan)
 January 17 - Live Freaky! Die Freaky! (United States)
 February 2 - Blood Tea and Red String (United States)
 February 7:
 Bambi II (United States)
 My Little Pony: The Princess Promenade (United States)
 February 10 - Curious George (United States)
 February 16 - Felix 2 – The Hare and the Verflixte Time Machine (Germany)
 February 17 - Impy's Island (Germany)
 February 21 - Ultimate Avengers (United States)
 February 23:
 Fimfárum 2 (Czech Republic)
 Prince Vladimir (Russia)
 February 24 - Doogal (France, United Kingdom, and United States)
 March 4:
 Dieter – The Film (Germany)
 Doraemon: Nobita's Dinosaur 2006 (Japan)
 Mobile Suit Zeta Gundam: A New Translation III – Love is the Pulse of the Stars (Japan)
 One Piece: The Giant Mechanical Soldier of Karakuri Castle (Japan)
 March 5 - Barbie: Mermaidia (United States)
 March 10 - Alexander the Great (Italy)
 March 11 - VeggieTales: Sheerluck Holmes and the Golden Ruler (United States)
 March 15:
 Dobrynya Nikitich and Zmey Gorynych (Russia)
 Renaissance (France, (United Kingdom, and Luxembourg)
 March 21 - The Adventures of Brer Rabbit (United States)
 March 31 - Ice Age: The Meltdown (United States)
 April 8 - Amazing Lives of the Fast Food Grifters (Japan)
 April 11 - Bratz Genie Magic (United States)
 April 12 - Asterix and the Vikings (France and Denmark)
 April 14 - The Wild (United States and Canada)
 April 15:
 Crayon Shin-chan: The Legend Called: Dance! Amigo! (Japan)
 Detective Conan: The Private Eyes' Requiem (Japan)
 April 18 - Wood & Stock: Sexo, Orégano e Rock'n'Roll (Brazil)
 April 21:
 Free Jimmy (Norway and United Kingdom)
 A Movie Of Eggs (Mexico
 April 28 - Manga Latina: Killer on the Loose (Canada and United Kingdom)
 April 30 - Barbie Diaries (United States)
 May 5 - Padre Pio (Italy)
 May 18 - The Blue Elephant (Thailand)
 May 19 - Over the Hedge (United States)
 May 26 - Mobile Suit Gundam SEED Destiny: Special Edition I – The Broken World (Japan)
 June 9 - Cars (United States)
 June 16 - Princess (Denmark and Germany)
 June 20 - Superman: Brainiac Attacks (United States)
 June 23 - Leroy & Stitch (United States)
 June 26 - Patoruzito: The Great Adventure (Argentina)
 June 28 - Aachi & Ssipak (South Korea)
 July 7:
 A Scanner Darkly (United States)
 Shark Bait (United States and South Korea)
 July 8 - Brave Story (Japan)
 July 12 - The Warrior (China)
 July 13 - Chika: The Rite of Perdition (United States)
 July 15:
 The Girl Who Leapt Through Time (Japan)
 Pokémon Ranger and the Temple of the Sea (Japan)
 July 16 - Queer Duck: The Movie (United States)
 July 21: 
 Kittu (India)
 Monster House (United States)
 July 27:
 Dragons: Destiny of Fire (Peru)
 Mobile Suit Gundam SEED Destiny: Special Edition II – Respective Swords (Japan)
 July 28 - The Ant Bully (United States)
 July 29:
 Tales from Earthsea (Japan)
 VeggieTales: LarryBoy and the Bad Apple (United States)
 August - Especial (Russia)
 August 4:
 Barnyard (United States and Germany)
 Livin' It Up With Bratz (United States)
 August 5 - Naruto the Movie: Guardians of the Crescent Moon Kingdom (Japan)
 August 8:
 City of Rott (United States)
 Ultimate Avengers 2: Rise of the Panther (United States)
 August 11 - Codename: Kids Next Door: Operation Z.E.R.O (United States)
 August 22 - Tom and Jerry: Shiver Me Whiskers (United States)
 August 25 - Robotech: The Shadow Chronicles (United States)
 August 29 - Brother Bear 2 (United States)
 September 1:
 Ghost in the Shell: Stand Alone Complex – Solid State Society (Japan)
 Lotte from Gadgetville (Estonia and Latvia)
 September 6 - Franklin and the Turtle Lake Treasure (Canada and France)
 September 8 - The Emperor's Secret (Finland)
 September 10 - Barbie in the 12 Dancing Princesses (United States)
 September 12:
 Bratz Babyz: The Movie (United States)
 The Legend of Sasquatch (United States)
 My Little Pony Crystal Princess: The Runaway Rainbow (United States)
 Tony Hawk in Boom Boom Sabotage (United States)
 September 15: 
 Everyone's Hero (Canada and United States)
 Teen Titans: Trouble in Tokyo (United States)
 September 19 - Scooby-Doo! Pirates Ahoy! (United States)
 September 21 - Oh, wie schön ist Panama (Germany)
 September 26 - Bratz: Passion 4 Fashion Diamondz (United States)
 September 29:
 Krishna (India)
 Open Season (United States)
 October 2 - Mobile Suit Gundam SEED Destiny: Special Edition III – Flames Of Destiny (Japan)
 October 5 - The Little Bastard and the Old Fart: Death Sucks (Germany)
 October 6 - The Ugly Duckling and Me! (Denmark, United Kingdom, and (France)
 October 7 - Strawberry Shortcake: The Sweet Dreams Movie (United States)
 October 11 - U (France)
 October 14 - Atagoal: Cat's Magical Forest (Japan)
 October 17 - John Paul II: The Friend of All Humanity (Vatican City and Spain)
 October 20 - Casper's Scare School (United States)
 October 25 - Azur & Asmar: The Princes' Quest (France, Belgium, Spain, and Italy)
 October 27 - Romeo & Juliet: Sealed with a Kiss (United States)
 October 28 - Hellboy Animated: Sword of Storms (United States)
 October 30 - Stonewall & Riot: The Ultimate Orgasm (United States)
 November 3 - Flushed Away (United Kingdom and United States)
 November 4:
 Cristobal Coolumbus (Spain)
 VeggieTales: Gideon: Tuba Warrior (United States)
 November 6 - A Christmas Carol: Scrooge's Ghostly Tale (United States)
 November 14:
 Bah, Humduck! A Looney Tunes Christmas (United States)
 PollyWorld (United States)
 November 17 - Happy Feet (United States and Australia)
 November 19 - Desmond & the Swamp Barbarian Trap (Sweden)
 November 25 - Paprika (Japan)
 November 29 - Arthur and the Invisibles (France)
 December 6 - The Land Before Time XII: The Great Day of the Flyers (United States)
 December 9 - Pretty Cure Splash Star Tic-Tac Crisis Hanging by a Thin Thread! (Japan)
 December 12 - The Fox and the Hound 2 (United States)
 December 16:
 Animal Crossing: The Movie (Japan)
 Bleach: Memories of Nobody (Japan)
 Happily N'Ever After (United States and Germany)
 December 20 - Piccolo, Saxo and Company (France)
 December 22:
 The Magic Cube (Spain)
 Tekkonkinkreet (Japan)
 December 24 - Polar Adventures (Russia)
 Specific date unknown:
 The Adventures of Dragon Fruit (Taiwan)
 John Seven Seven (Portugal)
 Kong: Return To The Jungle (United States)
 Les naufragés de Carthage (Tunisia)
 Saint Catherine (Italy)

Television series debuts

Television series endings

Births

March
 March 1: Ramone Hamilton, American actor (voice of AJ in Blaze and the Monster Machines, George Beard in The Epic Tales of Captain Underpants, Axl in The Grinch, Max in Summer Camp Island, Crash Watkins in Karma's World, Coop in The Chicken Squad, Baxter Stockboy in the Rise of the Teenage Mutant Ninja Turtles episode "The Gumbus", Shaun in the Shimmer and Shine episode "Lightning Strikes Twice", singing voice of Crystal in Sofia the First).

April
 April 10: Dana Heath, American actress (voice of Bree in Fancy Nancy, Princess Kira Kiwi in Princess Power).

May
 May 20: Thalia Tran, American actress (voice of Little Noi in Raya and the Last Dragon).

June
 June 25: Mckenna Grace, American actress (voice of Ella Bird in The Angry Birds Movie, young Daphne Blake in Scoob!, Abigail Stone in Spirit Untamed, Tinia in Clarence, Cindy and Sugarbee in Pickle and Peanut, Bella in Elena of Avalor, Kambuni in The Lion Guard, Bitsy Beagleberg in Mickey and the Roadster Racers).
 June 28: Laurel Griggs, American child actress (voice of Stella, Crab Sprout 1 and 2 and Crab Kid in Bubble Guppies), (d. 2019).
 June 29: Sam Lavagnino, American voice actor (voice of Mr. Muffin in Asdfmovie, Catbug in Bravest Warriors, Munchie in Sanjay and Craig, Eenie in The 7D, young Grizz in We Bare Bears, Blodger Blop in Miles From Tomorrowland, Rolly in seasons 1–3 of Puppy Dog Pals, Pepper and King in Summer Camp Island, Ozzy in The Grinch, Finngard in DreamWorks Dragons: Rescue Riders, Allan in Soul, Cam in Alice's Wonderland Bakery, Rings in Craig of the Creek).

July
 July 17: Lilly Bartlam, Canadian actress (voice of Gwen in Total DramaRama, Harmony in Cyberchase, Skye in seasons 6-present of PAW Patrol).

September
 September 7: Ian Chen, Taiwanese-American actor (voice of Jonathan in Fancy Nancy, Logan in The Rocketeer, young Din in Wish Dragon).
 September 20: Amir O'Neil, American actor (voice of Marty in Madagascar: A Little Wild).

October
 October 1: Priah Ferguson, American actress (voice of Bailey in Hamster & Gretel, Lisa in My Dad the Bounty Hunter).
 October 5: Jacob Tremblay, Canadian actor (voice of Damian Wayne / Robin in Harley Quinn, the title character in Luca, Elmer Elevator in My Father's Dragon).
 October 17: Maxwell Simkins, American actor (voice of Little Boo in The Chicken Squad).

December
 December 9: Pixie Davies, English actress (voice of Razzi the Rat in 101 Dalmatian Street, Adel in The Magician's Elephant).

Deaths

January
 January 6: Lou Rawls, American actor and singer (performed in several Garfield specials, voice of Harvey in Hey Arnold!, himself in The Proud Family episode "The Party"), dies at age 72.
 January 10: Dennis Marks, American screenwriter, producer and voice actor (Batfink, Dungeons and Dragons, shows for Hanna-Barbera, DC, and Marvel Comics), dies at age 73.
 January 17: Norman McCabe, English-American animator and illustrator (Warner Brothers Animation, DePatie-Freleng, Filmation), dies at age 94.
 January 26: Len Carlson, Canadian actor (voice of Green Goblin in Spider-Man, Professor Coldheart in Care Bears, Bert Racoon in The Raccoons, Buzz in Cyberchase, Minimus P.U. in Atomic Betty, Principal Mulligan in Flying Rhino Junior High, Robert Kelly in X-Men, Ganon in The Legend of Zelda and Captain N: The Game Master, Loki in The Marvel Super Heroes), dies at age 68.

February
 February 3: 
 Walerian Borowczyk, Polish film director and animator (Renaissance, Jeux des Anges, Théâtre de Monsieur & Madame Kabal, Les Astronautes), dies at age 82.
 Al Lewis, American actor (voice of the Godfather in Coonskin), dies at age 82.
 February 4: Myron Waldman, American animator and comics artist (worked for Fleischer Brothers and Hal Seeger), dies at age 97.
 February 7: Andrea Bresciani Slovenian-Italian animator and comics artist (worked for Hanna-Barbera), dies at age 83.
 February 24: 
 Don Knotts, American actor (portrayed and voiced Henry Limpet in The Incredible Mr. Limpet, voice of T.W. Turtle in Cats Don't Dance, Mayor Turkey Lurkey in Chicken Little, himself in the Johnny Bravo episodes "Johnny Bravo Goes to Hollywood" and "Johnny Makeover" and The New Scooby-Doo Movies), dies at age 81.
 Dennis Weaver, American actor and former president of the Screen Actors Guild (voice of Dusty and Josh in Captain Planet and the Planeteers, Abner Dixon in Home on the Range, Buck McCoy in The Simpsons episode "The Lastest Gun in the West"), dies from prostate cancer at age 81.

March
 March 4: David Rose, American animator (Warner Bros. Cartoons), dies at age 95.
 March 8: Rhoda Williams, American actress (voice of Drizella in Cinderella), dies at age 75.
 March 17: Bob Papenbrook, American voice actor (voice of Katsuhito Masaki and Nobuyuki Masaki in Tenchi Muyo!), dies at age 50.
 March 19: Brad Case, American animator (Walt Disney Animation, Walter Lantz, Warner Bros. Animation, Hanna-Barbera, DePatie-Freleng, Marvel Productions), dies at age 93.

May
 May 26: Steven Konichek, Czech composer and conductor (Munro, Gene Deitch, Popeye the Sailor, Tom and Jerry, Jan Svankmajer), dies at age 78. 
 May 27: Alex Toth, American comics artist and animator (Space Ghost), dies from a heart attack at age 77.
 May 30: Bill Kovacs, American animator (Tron), dies at age 55.

June
 June 26: Jeff Winkless, American voice actor, dies at age 65.
 June 28: Lennie Weinrib, American voice actor (original voice of Scrappy-Doo, King Leonidas and the secretary bird in Bedknobs and Broomsticks, Hunk in Voltron: Defender of the Universe, Bigmouth in The Smurfs), dies at age 71.

July
 July 8: Peter Hawkins, English actor (voice of the Flower Pot Men, Lord Chamberlain and Albert Weatherspoon in A Rubovian Legend, Captain Pugwash, narrator of Noah and Nelly in... SkylArk and SuperTed, Dennis in Penny Crayon), dies at age 82.
 July 21: Mako, Japanese-American actor (voice of Iroh in Avatar: The Last Airbender, Aku in Samurai Jack, Mr. Yamaguchi in Rugrats in Paris: The Movie, Happy Cat and Ah-Choo in Duck Dodgers, Master Splinter in TMNT, the Ancient One in the What's New, Scooby-Doo? episode "Big Appetite in Little Tokyo", the Narrator in The Grim Adventures of Billy & Mandy episode "A Kick in the Asgard", Master Offay in the Super Robot Monkey Team Hyperforce Go! episode "Monster Battle Club Now!"), dies from respiratory arrest caused by esophageal cancer at age 72.
 July 27: Elisabeth Volkmann, German actress and comedian (dub voice of Marge Simpson and Patty and Selma in The Simpsons), dies at age 70.
 July 28: Volodymyr Dakhno, Ukrainian film director, animator and scriptwriter (Cossacks), dies at age 74.

August
 August 11: Mike Douglas, American singer, TV host and actor (singing voice of Prince Charming in Cinderella), dies at age 86.
 August 12: Magdalo Mussio, Italian animator, dies at age 81.
 August 13: Tony Jay, English actor (voice of Claude Frollo in The Hunchback of Notre Dame, Monsieur D'Arque in Beauty and the Beast, Megabyte in ReBoot, Shere Khan in TaleSpin, Jungle Cubs, The Jungle Book 2, and House of Mouse, Baron Mordo in Spider-Man, Galactus and Terrax in Fantastic Four, Chairface Chippendale in The Tick, Lord Dregg in Teenage Mutant Ninja Turtles) dies at age 73.
 August 28: Ed Benedict, American animator, character designer and lay-out artist (Walt Disney Studios, Walter Lantz, Tex Avery, Hanna-Barbera), dies at age 94.

September
 September 5: Steve Irwin,  Australian zookeeper, conservationist, television personality, wildlife expert and environmentalist (voice of Trev in Happy Feet), dies at age 44.
 September 6: Jan Svochak, Czech-American animator (Famous Studios, Pelican, Elektra, Zanders, Perpetual Motion Pictures, Buzzco, J.J. Sedelmaier Productions, the Punchy advertisements), dies at age 81.
 September 7: Bernard Wolf, American film producer (Paramount Studios, Fleischer Studios, Ub Iwerks, Walt Disney Animation Studios, MGM, Rudolph Ising, Sesame Street, Hanna-Barbera), dies at age 95.
 September 13: Ann Richards, American politician (voice of Annie in Home on the Range, Thunder Mountain Woman in the Happily Ever After: Fairy Tales for Every Child episode "Rip Van Winkle", herself in the King of the Hill episode "Hank and the Great Glass Elevator"), dies at age 73.

October
 October 16: Tommy Johnson, American orchestral tuba player (Walt Disney Animation Studios, All Dogs Go to Heaven, Tom and Jerry: The Movie, Toy Story, Toy Story 2, Antz, Ice Age, Looney Tunes: Back in Action, Mickey, Donald, Goofy: The Three Musketeers, The Ant Bully), dies at age 71.
 October 18: Don R. Christensen, American animator, comics artist and writer, scriptwriter (Walt Disney Company, Warner Bros. Cartoons, DePatie-Freleng, Filmation, Hanna-Barbera), dies at age 90.

November
 November 11: Ronnie Stevens, English actor (narrator and additional voices in Noggin the Nog), dies at age 81.
 November 26: Anthony Jackson, English actor (voice of Dai Station, Evans the Song, Mr. Dinwiddy in Ivor the Engine, Nug and Mr. Blossom in The Dreamstone), dies at age 62.
 November 30: Shirley Walker, American composer and conductor (Warner Bros. Animation), dies from a stroke at age 61.

December
 December 1: Sid Raymond, American comedian and voice actor (voice of Baby Huey and Katnip), dies at age 97.
 December 8: Martha Tilton, American singer (voice of Clarice in the Chip 'n' Dale cartoon Two Chips and a Miss), dies at age 91.
 December 18: Joseph Barbera, American animator,  storyboard artist, director and producer (MGM, co-founder of Hanna-Barbera), dies at age 95.
 December 25: James Brown, American singer, dancer, musician, record producer and bandleader (voice of Hostage Negotiator in the Duckman episode "Kidney, Popsicle, and Nuts", himself in The Simpsons episode "Bart's Inner Child"), dies from heart failure at age 73.
 December 28: Prescott Wright, American film distributor and animation producer (founder of the Ottawa International Animation Festival, produced the International Tournée of Animation, creative staffing specialist of Disney's Feature Division), dies at age 71.

Specific date unknown
 Bennie Nobori, American animator and comics artist, dies at an unknown age.

See also
2006 in anime

References

External links 
Animated works of the year, listed in the IMDb

 
2000s in animation